The Bowling competition in the 2009 Asian Youth Games was held in the Orchid Country Club in Singapore between 1 and 6 July 2009.

Medalists

Boys

Girls

Medal table

Results

Boys

Singles
1 July

Doubles
2 July

Team of 4
3–4 July

Masters

Preliminary
5–6 July

Finals
6 July

Girls

Singles
1 July

Doubles
2 July

Team of 4
3–4 July

Masters

Preliminary
5–6 July

Finals
6 July

References
 Official site
 www.abf-online.org

2009 Asian Youth Games events
2009 Asian Youth Games
Asian Youth Games